Frederick Arthur Martin (13 December 1925 – September 1969) was an English professional footballer who made over 230 appearances in the Midland League for Peterborough United as a centre forward. He briefly played in the Football League for Nottingham Forest.

Career statistics

Honours 
Peterborough United

 Peterborough Hospital Cup: 1949–50

References 

English Football League players
Clapton Orient F.C. wartime guest players
English footballers
Association football forwards
1925 births
1969 deaths
Footballers from Nottingham
Nottingham Forest F.C. players
Peterborough United F.C. players
Skegness Town A.F.C. players